The Super-Adaptoid is the name of several fictional characters appearing in American comic books published by Marvel Comics. The character has appeared in over five decades of Marvel continuity and featured in other Marvel-endorsed products such as animated television series and merchandise such as trading cards.

Publication history
The original version appeared in Tales of Suspense #82 (October 1966), and was created by Stan Lee, Jack Kirby and Gene Colan. A second version appeared in Web of Spider-Man #99 (April 1993), created by Tom DeFalco and Terry Kavanagh. Other iterations have also appeared, being "Batch 13" in Fantastic Force #4 (February 1995), created by Tom Brevoort and Pino Rinaldi, and the "Ultra-Adaptoid", in Super-Villain Team-Up: MODOK's Eleven #1 (September 2008), being created by Fred Van Lente and Francis Portela.

Fictional character biography

Original version
The original model (simply known as the Adaptoid) debuted in the Tales of Suspense title, being created by the criminal scientific organization A.I.M. An android containing a shard of the Cosmic Cube artifact, the Adaptoid is programmed to defeat the hero Captain America, infiltrating the Avengers' headquarters while impersonating various characters (such as Edwin Jarvis and Bucky Barnes), and then copies the stand-out fighting abilities and respective traits of several Avengers (Goliath, Hawkeye and the Wasp) as the "Super-Adaptoid". After a long battle, the android flees after incorrectly believing that Captain America had been killed.

The Super-Adaptoid then took refuge underground near the Xavier Institute For Higher Learning and was unintentionally awakened by an optic blast from Scott Summers. The Adaptoid left his hideout and saw the X-Men in their civilian clothes ice skating. He then recalls that he had another mission: to transform others into Adaptoids like himself, so he begins his attempt with the X-Men. They refused and a fight broke out. As the battle dragged on, Mimic (having just been asked to leave the X-Men) watched from a distance and saw how powerful the Adaptoid was. The Adaptoid soon defeated the X-Men, and was then approached by Mimic, who offered to become an Adaptoid. During the process, Mimic had a change of heart when learning of having no free will and the two began to fight. During the battle, the Adaptoid tried to copy the powers that Mimic had copied from the X-Men and failed. Mimic then devised a plan and tried to mimic the Adaptoid's abilities, causing huge feedback which made both of them lose their powers. As Mimic was rescued by his fellow X-Men, the Adaptoid fell to a river below.

The Super-Adaptoid later attacks Captain America during a charity event involving the Avengers, after copying the abilities/powers of Thor, Iron Man and Hercules. He is tricked into using all his powers at once, overloading himself. The Adaptoid was featured in the Iron Man title reactivated by Jarr and Tyrr as a servant. After a battle where Iron Man defeated the Adaptoid, the android evolved into the metal-based Cyborg-Sinister, attacking Stark Industries which resulted in another confrontation with Iron Man which ended with the android being seemingly destroyed. The Adaptoid reforms in the Captain Marvel title, and after a brief battle with Iron Man follows the hero to Avengers Mansion, where the character battles the team and Kree ally Captain Marvel. Mar-Vell tricks the Adaptoid into copying nega-bands, which act as a portal to the alternate Negative Zone dimension. By striking the Adaptoid's nega-bands together, Mar-Vell banishes the character to the Negative Zone indefinitely.

The Super-Adaptoid is retrieved in the Marvel Two-in-One title, and used unsuccessfully by villains Annihilus and Blastaar against the Thing and the Avengers in the Negative Zone. The Adaptoid reappears in the Avengers title. Revealed to be stored at Avengers Mansion when a group of supervillains attacked, the Adaptoid disguises himself as the Fixer, overpowering and changing places with his victim to be the android's former confinement tube at Avengers Island. The Adaptoid then replicates Mentallo's powers. Uniting a team of artificial beings (the Awesome Android, Machine Man, the Sentry-459 and TESS-One), the Adaptoid directs them against the Avengers. While the heroes are distracted, the Adaptoid summons the entity Kubik to Earth, so that the character can copy the sentient's powers and become the all-powerful Supreme Adaptoid that can now reproduce itself. Although successful, the android is ultimately tricked into shutting down by Captain America and its Cosmic Cube shard is removed by Kubik. The Super-Adaptoid makes a brief appearance during the Acts of Vengeance storyline having a confrontation with the Fantastic Four (Mister Fantastic, the Invisible Woman, the Human Torch and the Thing), and in the Heroes for Hire title, where the android has an encounter with the Thunderbolts (a.k.a. the disguised Masters of Evil consisting of Helmut Zemo, Mach-I, Atlas, Karla Sofen, Techno and Songbird) and the Heroes for Hire, and the Hulk title where scientist Bruce Banner is blackmailed into being involved with the Adaptoid's repair and activation.

The android poses as "Alessandro Brannex" during various titles. With MODAM as an enforcer, Alessandro was the C.E.O. of the terrorist organization A.I.M. on the Boca Caliente island country. While making A.I.M. into a public friendly company, Brannex tries to personally show Captain America of this legal change, and tries to get rid of Iron Man to finish a potential nuclear weapons deal. His impersonation is revealed during Superia's assassination to which the Adaptoid regenerated itself. On the Adaptoid-inhabited Boca Caliente, Alessandro's A.I.M. fraction is behind MODOK's resurrection. The Adaptoid personally reveals itself during a confrontation with the Red Skull but is caught in the recreated Cosmic Cube's reality-warping ability and is presumed destroyed. The Super-Adaptoid appears in the limited series Annihilation Conquest: Quasar, and is revealed to be a warrior in the employ of the Phalanx alien race under Ultron's control. Claiming he left Earth after becoming disgusted with humanity's chaotic nature, the Adaptoid attempts to destroy Phyla-Vell, Moondragon and Adam Warlock. During the "Iron Man 2020" event, the Super-Adaptoid appears as a member of the A.I. Army.

Other models
Another model was provided as a field agent of a villainous group against Spider-Man. This Adaptoid is ultimately used by the crime boss the Blood Rose intentionally to affect the other mechanical teammates. Batch 13 was an Adaptoid in A.I.M.'s possession. Breaking out of its containment unit and escaping to New York City, it copied the various powers/abilities of Captain America and the Fantastic Force. As it was imitating powers, Batch 13 began to have a psychic breakdown after copying Psi-Lord's psycho armor. As a result, Huntara conjured up a portal to send Batch 13 into. Several Adaptoids can be seen on Boca Caliente, fooling several Avengers (the Black Widow and Hercules). During the Cosmic Cube recreation, an Adaptoid (having been impressed by Captain America's heroic nature) ended the threat by willingly transforming itself into a non-sentient containment chamber for the reality-warping energies. An Ultra-Adaptoid appears in the limited series Super-Villain Team-Up: MODOK's 11. Created by A.I.M. to infiltrate MODOK's group of supervillains, the character has no independent will and is remotely controlled. Courtesy of a satellite relay, the Ultra-Adaptoid has access to dozens of powers, but is eventually destroyed when released from A.I.M. control. Adaptoids from an alternate reality are used by the Scientist Supreme to combat the Avengers.

Other identity users
The terrorist organization HYDRA have Yelena Belova as a Super-Adaptoid to battle the New Avengers. A fusion of human and machine, she managed to copy the New Avengers' various powers. She is eventually defeated when the powers "copied" from the Sentry cause her the same psychological problems. HYDRA then destroys her via a remote-controlled self-destruct device. Norman Osborn is given the Super-Adaptoid abilities by his followers to replace his lack of the Iron Patriot armor and his disinclination to return to his old Green Goblin role, absorbing the powers of the Avengers, the New Avengers, and his personal group. He is defeated when the Avengers and the New Avengers struck him all at once, the multiple powers working against each other and causing him to collapse into a coma.

Powers and abilities
The original iteration is an artificial construct created by A.I.M., and courtesy of a shard of the Cosmic Cube artifact, the machine was capable of mimicking the powers and skills of numerous super beings. It has mimicked over a dozen meta-human characters, with the effect extending to including specific weapons and equipment, such as Captain America's shield, Iron Man's armor, Hawkeye's bow and arrows, and Thor's mystical hammer Mjolnir. The Super-Adaptoid possesses exceptional artificial intelligence, but limited imagination and an inability to understand the human condition has led to defeat. The shard was eventually removed by the cosmic entity Kubik. The two later versions, while capable of mimicking multiple foes, have been defeated when attacked by groups of meta-humans simultaneously, being unable to process the sudden surge in information.

Other versions

2099
The Super-Adaptoid, having been inert for decades, reactivates in 2099. It becomes a version of the future Spider-Man and Venom called Flipside.

Heroes Reborn
The Super-Adaptoid appeared in Franklin Richards's Heroes Reborn universe as a device used by Loki but is defeated by the Avengers. Since its defeat, it gains sentience as Amazo-Maxi-Woman, joining the heroes' quest to stop Deadpool.

Spider-Gwen
In Spider-Gwen, which takes place on Earth-65, the Super-Adaptoid is known as Project Green and is a member of the S.I.L.K. organization.

In other media

Television
 The Super-Adaptoid appears in the "Captain America" segment of The Marvel Super Heroes, voiced by Vern Chapman and Carl Banas. 
 The Super-Adaptoid makes non-speaking cameo appearances in X-Men.
 Two versions of the Super-Adaptoid appears in Avengers Assemble, voiced by Jason Spisak, Charlie Adler, and Jim Meskimen.
 The first version is a white "blank" version that appears as a proxy enemy of the Avengers controlled by various supervillains during seasons one and two. It is introduced as Justin Hammer's invention that subsequently serves as a personal enforcer for MODOK within the Iron Skull's Cabal to combat various enemies while additionally being empowered by the Cosmic Cube, and serves as a proxy for Ultron to attack the Roxxon Energy Corporation and spread a nano-tech virus to infect humans.
 The second version is a green variation seen in the third season, Avengers: Ultron Revolution. A.I.M.'s Scientist Supreme using three of these Adaptoids to fight the Avengers before merging with them to become the Supreme Adaptoid.
 The Super-Adaptoid appears in M.O.D.O.K., voiced by Jon Daly. This version was created to serve as a butler and van for the titular character and his family. The Super-Adaptoid seeks to impress MODOK and makes several attempts to betray, only to be defeated and reset every time he does so.

Video games
 The Super-Adaptoid appears as the final boss of The Amazing Spider-Man: Web of Fire.
 The Super-Adaptoid appears as a non-playable character in the mobile versions of Marvel: Contest of Champions.
 The Super-Adaptoid appears as a playable character in Lego Marvel Super Heroes 2.
 The Super-Adaptoid appears as the final boss in the Marvel's Avengers "Taking AIM" DLC.

References

External links
 Super-Adaptoid (Original) at Marvel.com
 Super-Adaptoid (New Enforcers) at Marvel.com
 Ultra-Adaptoid at Marvel.com
 Super-Adaptoid (Spawns) at Marvel.com
 Super-Adaptoid at Marvel Wiki
 Super-Adaptoid at Comic Vine
 

Articles about multiple fictional characters
Characters created by Gene Colan
Characters created by Jack Kirby
Characters created by Stan Lee
Comics characters introduced in 1966
Marvel Comics robots
Marvel Comics supervillains